RuPaul Charles is an American drag queen, actor, model, singer, songwriter, and television personality. He is considered to be the most famous drag queen ever, and in 2017 he was included in the annual Time 100 list of the most influential people in the world.

Since 2009, he has produced and hosted the reality competition series RuPaul's Drag Race and its various spin-offs, such as All Stars, Untucked and Drag Race UK. RuPaul's Drag Race was met with critical acclaim and was praised for "creat[ing] an entertainingly voyeuristic glimpse into the performance art world of drag queens". It has earned Charles twelve Primetime Emmy Awards, making him the person with the most wins in the category of Outstanding Host for a Competition Program and the most-awarded person of color in the show's history, one Critics' Choice Television Award, and four Producers Guild of America Awards. RuPaul's Drag Race UK was nominated for two BAFTA TV Awards, while Canada's Drag Race won several Canadian Screen Awards, with Charles being the recipient of two Best Reality/Competition Series awards as one of the executive producers of the show. In 2022, he won the Tony Award for Best Musical for producing the Broadway show A Strange Loop.

Charles had already achieved international fame as a drag queen with the release of his single "Supermodel (You Better Work)", from the album Supermodel of the World (1993), for which he received two Billboard Music Awards and an MTV Video Music Award nomination. He was also honored with the GLAAD Vito Russo Award in 1999, presented to an openly LGBT media professional who has made a significant difference in promoting equality for the LGBT community, and in 2018 he received a star on the Hollywood Walk of Fame for his contributions to the television industry, making him the first drag queen to be given such an award.

Awards, honors and nominations

See also 
 List of awards and nominations received by RuPaul's Drag Race

Notes

References

External links 
  

RuPaul
RuPaul
RuPaul